P300/CBP-associated factor (PCAF), also known as K(lysine) acetyltransferase 2B (KAT2B), is a human gene and transcriptional coactivator associated with p53.

Structure
Several domains of PCAF can act independently or in unison to enable its functions. PCAF has separate acetyltransferase and E3 ubiquitin ligase domains as well as a bromodomain for interaction with other proteins. PCAF also possesses sites for its own acetylation and ubiquitination.

Function 
CBP and p300 are large nuclear proteins that bind to many sequence-specific factors involved in cell growth and/or differentiation, including c-jun and the adenoviral oncoprotein E1A. The protein encoded by the PCAF gene associates with p300/CBP. It has in vitro and in vivo binding activity with CBP and p300, and competes with E1A for binding sites in p300/CBP. It has histone acetyl transferase activity with core histones and nucleosome core particles, indicating that this protein plays a direct role in transcriptional regulation.

Regulation
The acetyltransferase activity and cellular location of PCAF are regulated through acetylation of PCAF itself. PCAF may be autoacetylated (acetylated by itself) or by p300. Acetylation leads to migration to the nucleus and enhances its acetyltransferase activity. PCAF interacts with and is deacetylated by HDAC3, leading to a reduction in PCAF acetyltransferase activity and cytoplasmic localisation.

Protein interactions
PCAF forms complexes with numerous proteins that guide its activity. For example PCAF is recruited by ATF to acetylate histones and promote transcription of ATF4 target genes.

Targets
There are various protein targets of PCAF's acetyltransferase activity including transcription factors such as Fli1, p53 and numerous histone residues. Hdm2, itself a ubiquitin ligase that targets p53, has also been demonstrated to be a target of the ubiquitin-ligase activity of PCAF.

Interactions 
PCAF has been shown to interact with:

 BRCA2, 
 CTNNB1, 
 CREBBP, 
 EVI1, 
 HNF1A,
 IRF1, 
 IRF2, 
 KLF13, 
 Mdm2 
 Myc, 
 NCOA1, 
 POLR2A, 
 RBPJ, 
 TCF3, 
 TRRAP,  and
 TWIST1.

See also 
 Transcription coregulator
 Acetyltransferase

References

External links

Further reading 

 
 
 
 
 
 
 
 
 
 
 
 
 
 
 
 
 
 
 
 

Gene expression
Transcription coregulators